G antigen 12F is a protein that in humans is encoded by the GAGE12F gene.

References

Further reading